Heinz Hoppichler (27 September 1905 – ?) was an Austrian bobsledder who competed in the early 1950s. At the 1952 Winter Olympics in Oslo, he finished 16th in the two-man event and did not finish the four-man event.

References

1952 bobsleigh two-man results
1952 bobsleigh four-man results

Austrian male bobsledders
Olympic bobsledders of Austria
Bobsledders at the 1952 Winter Olympics
Year of death missing
1905 births